The 2009 Continental Tire Sports Car Challenge season was the ninth running of the Grand Am Cup Series. It began on January 22 and ran for ten rounds.

Schedule

Daytona International Speedway
Homestead Miami Speedway
New Jersey Motorsports Park
Mazda Raceway Laguna Seca
Lime Rock Park- split classes
Watkins Glen International- long course
Mid-Ohio Sports Car Course- split classes
Barber Motorsports Park
Circuit de Trois-Rivieres
Miller Motorsports Park
Virginia International Raceway

Continental Tire Sports Car Challenge